A mixiote is a traditional pit-barbecued meat dish in central Mexico; especially in the Basin of Mexico.  It can also be prepared in an oven.  It is usually made with mutton or rabbit, but chicken, lamb, and pork are also used. The meat is cubed with the bone and seasoned with pasilla and guajillo chili peppers, cumin, thyme, marjoram, bay leaves, cloves and garlic. It is then wrapped in small packages made of the tough semi-transparent outer skin of the leaves of the maguey or century plant, which gives it a unique flavor. Diced nopales are often included with the meat before wrapping. In the cities, "parchment" or baking paper or even aluminum foil was also used to wrap the mixiotes, which can be considered a reminiscence of the old French technique of baking "en papillote", or the Italian "al cartoccio" (in the cartridge). Incidentally, this technique is traditional in many culinary cultures: pepes in Indonesia; zongzi in China; dolmades in Eastern Europe and Central Asia, as well as in Central America, where tamales are usually cooked this way, or for the preparation of pamonha in Brazil. The difference is that the use of xiotl gives the food a special flavor, which cannot be substituted.

See also

 List of barbecue dishes
 List of lamb dishes
 List of meat dishes
 List of Mexican dishes

References

Barbecue
Lamb dishes
Mexican cuisine
Meat dishes